The 1975 United States Grand Prix was a Formula One motor race held on October 5, 1975, at the Watkins Glen Grand Prix Race Course in Watkins Glen, New York. It was race 14 of 14 in both the 1975 World Championship of Drivers and the 1975 International Cup for Formula One Manufacturers. It was the 25th United States Grand Prix since the first American Grand Prize was held in 1908 and the 18th since the first United States Grand Prix at Riverside in 1958.

The race was won by the new world champion, Austrian driver Niki Lauda driving a Ferrari 312T. Lauda took his fifth win for the season by a four-second margin over outgoing world champion, Brazilian Emerson Fittipaldi in a McLaren M23. Fittipaldi's West German teammate Jochen Mass finished third. The second place allowed Fittipaldi to confirm runner's up position in the points race after a half-season long battle with Argentine Brabham driver Carlos Reutemann, although Fittipaldi's McLaren team would fall one point short of overhauling Brabham in the Constructors battle to be second behind Ferrari.

Background 
Ferrari had already taken eight poles, five wins, the Drivers' Championship and the Constructors' Championship in 1975, but had never won the United States Grand Prix. Nor had any driver ever won the American race in the year he claimed the title up to this point.

Canadian controversy 
There was controversy before practice began. The Canadian Grand Prix had been cancelled and the organizers had arrived in the paddock with a writ to freeze the prize money over legal wrangles. There were also disputes with the Grand Prix Drivers' Association over transfer fees and wages.

Circuit changes 
The track had been modified for this race by the addition of the "Scheckter chicane" at the bottom of the hill entering the esses. After François Cevert's fatal crash there two years earlier, the corner was deemed to be too fast. Named for the Tyrrell driver who suggested it, the chicane was expected to add nearly five seconds to the lap times.

Qualifying summary 
Mark Donohue had been fatally injured in practice for the Austrian Grand Prix, and John Watson had replaced Donohue on the Penske team. Penske fielded the brand new PC3 for Watson, Although bearing the Penske name The Englishman used the car in practice, but due to a technical failure was forced to switch to the old PC1, which was in the paddock as a demonstrator, for the race. Lauda was quickest from the start, as the drivers got accustomed to the new layout. Vittorio Brambilla briefly registered in with quickest time on Friday, just one hundredth of a second better than Lauda. Lauda's engine developed a vibration, but the Austrian used the spare car to beat the March's time by almost a second. On Saturday, it was Emerson Fittipaldi who briefly held the pole at 1:42.360, but Lauda answered his challenge as well, ending the discussion at 1:42.003. Carlos Reutemann, Jean-Pierre Jarier, Mario Andretti and Brambilla took the rest of the top six positions on the grid.

Race summary 
On race day, Watson's Penske suffered electrical problems in the morning warmup. As he was being towed in, the crew retrieved the display car from the First National Citibank podium in the paddock and prepared it to enter the race. Lella Lombardi's Williams suffered an electrical failure, and her teammate Jacques Laffite was unable to race after mistaking visor cleaning fluid for his eyedrops. Lombardi tried to use Laffite's car, but she didn't fit.

 
Lauda led the field away from the grid and through the new chicane for the first time, followed by Fittipaldi, Jarier, Brambilla, Reutemann and Andretti. Carlos Pace and Patrick Depailler collided on lap 2, both retiring from the race as a result.

The gap between Lauda's Ferrari and Fittipaldi's McLaren settled at about one second. Mass, who had moved up to sixth, suddenly lost three places to Andretti, James Hunt, and Ronnie Peterson when he accidentally switched off his engine. On the next lap, with Mass now immediately in front of him, Clay Regazzoni smashed his nose against the rear wheel of the McLaren and lost more than a lap as he pitted for a new one. On lap 10, Reutemann's engine expired and Andretti's front suspension collapsed. This left Lauda and Fittipaldi twelve seconds ahead of Jarier, who was five seconds clear of a group containing Hunt, Brambilla, Mass, Peterson and Scheckter.

Lauda's teammate Regazzoni was caught by the leaders on lap 18, after his lengthy pit stop. He let Lauda by, but held up Fittipaldi for six laps, despite blue flags being waved to indicate that he should be let through. Eventually Regazzoni was black flagged and brought in for a warning on lap 24; Ferrari manager Luca di Montezemolo instructed Regazzoni to continue the race, but withdrew him from the race in protest just after four laps.

Back on the track, Fittipaldi was now 15 seconds behind Lauda, Jarier had retired with a seized rear wheel bearing, Brambilla dropped back to seventh suffering from loose seat supports, and Hunt, Mass, Peterson and Scheckter were battling for third. Mass overtook Hunt on lap 33. With nine laps to go, Peterson also passed Hunt, who was struggling with his gear selection and brake balance. Three laps from the finish, Mass's brakes began to fade, and Peterson closed, but locked up his left front tire under braking. The resulting flat spot slowed him enough for Hunt to retake fourth on the last lap. Lauda took the win by just under five seconds.

This was the final race for Tony Brise and Embassy Racing with Graham Hill. On the evening of 29 November 1975, double-world champion Graham Hill was piloting a Piper Aztec light aircraft from France to London. His passengers were team manager Ray Brimble, driver Tony Brise, designer Andy Smallman and mechanics Terry Richards and Tony Alcock. They were returning from Circuit Paul Ricard where they had been testing the GH2 car being prepared for 1976. They were due to land at Elstree airfield before onward travel to London to attend a party. Shortly before 10pm, the plane hit trees beside a golf course at Arkley in thick fog. In the ensuing crash and explosion, everyone on board was killed. As the team now only consisted of the deputy team manager and two mechanics, it was impossible to continue, and so the team was closed down.

Classification

Qualifying

Race

Championship standings after the race

Drivers' Championship standings

Constructors' Championship standings

References

Further reading
 Nye, Doug (1978). The United States Grand Prix and Grand Prize Races, 1908–1977. B. T. Batsford. 
 Walker, Rob (January, 1976). "17th United States Grand Prix: Ferrari's First World Championship Formula 1 Win In America". Road & Track, 70–73.

United States Grand Prix
United States Grand Prix
Grand Prix
United States Grand Prix
United States Grand Prix